Ytterbium(III) bromide (YbBr3) is an inorganic chemical compound.

Refer to the adjacent table for the main properties of Ytterbium(III) bromide.

Preparation 
Dissolving ytterbium oxide into 40% hydrobromic acid forms YbBr3·6H2O crystals. After mixing the hydrate with ammonium bromide and heating it in a vacuum, anhydrous YbBr3 can be obtained.
 Yb2O3 + 6 HBr → 2 YbBr3 + 3 H2O

Ytterbium(III) bromide can also be prepared by directly heating ytterbium oxide and ammonium bromide.

References

Bromides
Lanthanide halides
Ytterbium compounds